Jean-Michel Mis (born 28 July 1967) is a French politician of La République En Marche! (LREM) who has been serving as a member of the National Assembly since 18 June 2017, representing Loire's 2nd constituency.

Political career
In parliament, Mis serves on the Committee on Legal Affairs. In this capacity, he was the parliament’s rapporteur on the use of drones by law enforcement agencies.

In addition to his committee assignments, Mis is part of the French-Austrian Parliamentary Friendship Group, the French-Hungarian Parliamentary Friendship Group, the French-Armenian Parliamentary Friendship Group, and the French-Moldovan Parliamentary Friendship Group.

In July 2019, Mis voted in favor of the French ratification of the European Union’s Comprehensive Economic and Trade Agreement (CETA) with Canada.

See also
 2017 French legislative election

References

1967 births
Living people
Deputies of the 15th National Assembly of the French Fifth Republic
La République En Marche! politicians
Place of birth missing (living people)